Black Jack is an aniseed-flavored chewing gum manufactured by the American company, Gerrit J. Verburg Co.

In 1869, exiled former Mexican president and general Antonio Lopez de Santa Anna (famous for losing the Texas War of Independence) was living in New Jersey. He brought Mexican chicle with him in hopes of selling it to raise funds to help him return to power in his home country. He persuaded Thomas Adams of Staten Island, New York, to buy it. Adams, a photographer and inventor, intended to vulcanize the chicle for use as a rubber substitute. Adams' efforts at vulcanization failed, but he noticed that Santa Anna liked to chew the chicle, which the ancient Mayans had done. Disappointed with the rubber experiments, Adams boiled a small batch of chicle in his kitchen to create a chewing gum. He gave some to a local store to see if people would buy it; they did and he began production.

In 1871, Adams received a patent on a gum-making machine and began mass-producing chicle-based gum. His first product ("Snapping and Stretching") was pure chicle with no flavoring, but sold well enough to encourage Adams in his plans. He began to experiment with flavorings, beginning with sarsaparilla. In 1884, he began adding licorice flavoring and called his invention Adams' Black Jack, the first flavored gum in the U.S. It was also the first gum to be offered in sticks.

Black Jack Gum was sold well into the 1970s, when production ceased due to slow sales. It was re-introduced in 1986 and again in 2019.

Ownership 
Warner–Lambert acquired the American Chicle Company, including the Adams brand, in 1962. The American Chicle Company was renamed to Adams in 1997. Pfizer, which had bought Warner-Lambert in 2000, sold Adams and all of Pfizer's other candy brands to Cadbury in 2003. This unit became Cadbury Adams.

In 2019, Gerrit J. Verburg acquired the Black Jack gum brand among several others from Mondelez International, the parent company of Cadbury.

In popular culture 

In Season 3, Episode 5 of Seinfeld, titled The Library, Seinfeld incorrectly remembers that he returned a book, and had a witness to doing so: a girlfriend wearing an orange dress and chewing Black Jack gum.  (The girlfriend, Sherry, later corrects him, recalling her dress was purple and the gum was Dentyne. And, in fact, Jerry had lent the book to George, and the book was never seen again).

In the 1990 movie Pump Up The Volume, Christian Slater's character chews Black Jack gum. In the television series Homeland, the character of acting CIA director Saul Berenson is revealed as chewing a large amount of Black Jack gum during important operations for good luck.

References

Cadbury Adams brands
Chewing gum
Mondelez International brands
Anise
Brand name confectionery

External links
 Verburg Website